Charalampos Papazoglou, commonly known as either Maralabos Papazoglou or Charis Papazoglou (alternate spellings: Haris, Harris) (Greek: Χάρης Παπάζογλου; born October 5, 1953) is a Greek former professional basketball player and coach.

Club career
During his club career, Papazoglou played with the Greek teams Panathinaikos and AEK Athens. With Panathinaikos, he won seven Greek League championships (1971, 1972, 1973, 1974, 1975, 1977, 1980), and a Greek Cup title (1979). He also made it to the semifinals of the FIBA European Champions Cup (EuroLeague), during the 1971–72 season.

National team career
Papazoglou was a member of the junior national teams of Greece. With Greece's junior national team, he played at the 1972 FIBA Europe Under-18 Championship. He was also a member of the senior Greek national basketball team. With Greece, he played at the 1975 Mediterranean Games.

Coaching career
After he retired from playing basketball, Papazoglou worked as a basketball coach.

References

External links
FIBA Profile
Hellenic Basketball Federation Profile 

1953 births
Living people
AEK B.C. players
Greek basketball coaches
Greek men's basketball players
Kolossos Rodou B.C. coaches
Panathinaikos B.C. players
Competitors at the 1975 Mediterranean Games
Mediterranean Games competitors for Greece